The 2011 FIFA Women's World Cup qualification UEFA Group 3 was a UEFA qualifying group for the 2011 FIFA Women's World Cup. The group comprised Denmark, Scotland, Greece, Bulgaria and Georgia.

Denmark won the group and advanced to the play-off rounds.

Standings

Denmark win Group 3 and advance to the UEFA play-off rounds.

Results

Goalscorers

10 goals
  Johanna Rasmussen
7 goals
  Cathrine Paaske-Sørensen
6 goals
  Julie Fleeting
4 goals

  Lise Overgaard Munk
  Jen Beattie
  Kim Little
  Suzanne Grant

3 goals

  Camilla Sand Andersen
  Line Røddik Hansen
  Maiken Pape
  Pernille Harder
  Sanne Troelsgaard Nielsen
  Kalomoira Kontomichi
  Rachel Corsie

2 goals

  Katrine Veje
  Mia Brogaard
  Danai-Eleni Sidira
  Pauline Hamill

1 goal

  Andriana Boyanova
  Liliana Kostova
  Valentina Gospodinova
  Velina Koshuleva
  Janni Arnth Jensen
  Julie Rydahl Bukh
  Katrine Pedersen
  Kristine Pedersen
  Ana Pogosian
  Lela Chichinadze
  Tatiana Matveeva
  Anastasia Papadopoulou
  Dimitra Panteleiadou
  Glykeria Gkatzogianni
  Konstantina Katsaiti
  Panagiota Chalkiadaki
  Leanne Ross
  Liliana Kostova
  Mariann Gajhede

own goals

  Eleni Kakambouki
  Nino Pasikashvili
  Tamar Nadirashvili

External links
Regulations of the European Qualifying Competition for the 6th FIFA Women's World Cup

3
2009–10 in Greek football
2010–11 in Greek football
2009–10 in Bulgarian football
2010–11 in Bulgarian football
2009–10 in Georgian football
2010–11 in Georgian football
2009–10 in Danish women's football
2010–11 in Danish women's football
2009 in Scottish women's football
2010 in Scottish women's football